Komiks is a Philippine television fantasy-drama anthology broadcast by ABS-CBN from February 4, 2006, to August 8, 2009, replacing My Juan and Only and was replaced by Agimat: Ang Mga Alamat ni Ramon Revilla. The series features popular local comic book stories by comic writers Pablo S. Gomez, Francisco V. Coching, Mars Ravelo, Elena M. Patron, and Jim M. Fernandez and airs on Saturday evenings.

It can also be seen on TFC.

This series is currently streaming on Jeepney TV YouTube channel every 6:00 pm temporary replacing Wansapanataym.

Episodes
For a detailed episode guide, see the main article below.

The first season of the series presented 12 distinct stories over the course of 13 episodes. One of the stories (Agua Bendita) had two parts.

The second season likewise had 12 distinct stories but had 15 episodes, because three of the stories (Inday sa Balitaw, Bampy, and Si Pardina at mga Duwende) had two parts each.

The third and fourth season of Komiks breaks from the pattern of the first two seasons, with the entire season devoted to a single story, Da Adventures of Pedro Penduko. Matt Evans of PBB Teen Edition stars in the title role. Matt Evans once again occupied the fifth season of Komiks, with a whole new adventure and characters. It is dubbed as Pedro Penduko at ang Mga Engkantao.

After the much successful airing of "Pedro Penduko" series, Komiks was shelved for a while to give way for 1 vs. 100. In April 2008, Komiks resumed airing for sixth season with the collection of Mars Ravelo's works, with Kapitan Boom as its initial offering. This was followed by Varga, Tiny Tony, Dragonna and Flash Bomba.

Another and last Ravelo serial which is different from the Pinoy superheroes entitled Nasaan Ka Maruja? also aired.

Release

Unreleased/Undeveloped series

Awards
 2006 PMPC Star Awards for Television's Best Horror-Fantasy Program (tied with Mahiwagang Baul of GMA-7).
 2007 PMPC Star Awards for Television's Best Horror-Fantasy Program for Da Adventures of Pedro Penduko.

See also
List of programs previously aired by ABS-CBN
Da Adventures of Pedro Penduko
Pedro Penduko at ang Mga Engkantao
Lastikman (TV series)

References

External links

Fantaserye and telefantasya
ABS-CBN drama series
Television series by Dreamscape Entertainment Television
2006 Philippine television series debuts
2009 Philippine television series endings
Philippine anthology television series
Television shows based on comics
Filipino-language television shows